Albano may refer to:

Places
 Albano (river), Lombardy, Italy
 Lake Albano, Italy
 Roman Catholic Suburbicarian Diocese of Albano, near Rome
 Albano (Stockholm), an area in Stockholm, Sweden
 Albano Lacus, a hydrocarbon lake on Saturn's largest moon, Titan

People
 Albano (name), a list of people with the given name or surname
 Albano (footballer, born 1922), Albano Narciso Pereira (1922–1990), Portuguese football forward
 Albano (footballer, born 1997), Albano Sehn Neto, Brazilian football midfielder
 Albanus Albano, a pen name of Vaso Pasha (1825-1892), Albanian writer and poet and Governor General of Lebanon

Other uses
 Albano buoy system, used to mark lanes for rowing and canoeing events
 an alternative name for the Italian wine grape Trebbiano
 a synonym for the Italian wine grape Albana

See also
Albano Laziale, a comune in the province of Rome, Italy
Albano di Lucania, a comune in the province of Potenza, Italy
Albano Sant'Alessandro, a comune in the province of Bergamo, Italy
Albano Vercellese, a comune in the province of Vercelli, Italy
Al Bano (born 1943), Italian singer and actor